Burnett County may refer to:
 Burnet County, Texas
 Burnett County, Wisconsin